Jerzy Bronisław Braun, ps. "Bronisław Rogowski" (born September 1, 1901 in Dąbrowa Tarnowska, died October 17, 1975 in Rome) was a Polish writer, political activist, poet, playwright, literary critic, columnist, screenwriter, philosopher, scout, the last chairman of the Council of National Unity (from March to July 1945), and the last Government Delegate for Poland from June 1945.

References

1901 births
1975 deaths
20th-century Polish politicians
John Paul II Catholic University of Lublin alumni
Polish Scouts and Guides
Polish people of the Polish–Soviet War
Commanders of the Order of Polonia Restituta
Burials at Powązki Cemetery
Polish writers
Polish journalists
Polish poets
Warsaw Uprising insurgents
Polish anti-communists
Polish emigrants to Italy
20th-century Polish philosophers
Polish messianism